Lasha Malaghuradze (born June 2, 1986 in Tbilisi) is a Georgian rugby union player. His usual position is fly-half.

He played for Qochebi Tbilisi, where he won 2007 Georgia Championship, before moving to AS Béziers Hérault (2008/09-2010/11). He also played for Stade Bagnérais (2012/13-2015/16), before moving to Krasny Yar Krasnoyarsk, in Russia, where he plays since 2016/17.

After playing for Georgia Under-21 team, he made his debut for Georgia in 2008 against Portugal. He has 90 caps for Georgia, since 2008, with 5 tries, 37 conversions, 25 penalties and 3 drop goals scored, 183 points on aggregate.

References

External links
Lasha Malaghuradze International Statistics

1986 births
Rugby union players from Georgia (country)
Living people
Rugby union players from Tbilisi
Expatriate rugby union players from Georgia (country)
Expatriate rugby union players in France
Expatriate sportspeople from Georgia (country) in France
Georgia international rugby union players
Rugby union fly-halves
AS Béziers Hérault players
VVA Podmoskovye players